Elegy for a Dead World is a side-scrolling exploration game where the player writes a diary visible to other players. The player explores three worlds inspired by British romantic poets Shelley, Byron, and Keats. While exploring, the player makes notes on their observations. The notes are publicly visible via Steam Workshop. The collective note taking mechanic earned it an honorable mention for the Nuovo Award in the 2014 Independent Games Festival.

Development
Developer Ziba Scott credits the theme of the game to his love for British romantic poetry. Shelley's world, for example, was inspired by Percy Bysshe Shelley's poem "Ozymandias". Developer Ichiro Lambe is exploring the intimacy created through collaborative writing.

Reception

Early critical reception has focused on the novelty of the note taking mechanic, and the emphasis on narrative storytelling over action. 

On Metacritic, the game holds a score of 65/100 based on 14 reviews, indicating "mixed or average reviews".

Hardcore Gamer gave the game a 4 out of 5, saying "Elegy for a Dead World may be a jarring departure from traditions, but unlike the more pretentious attempts at alternative gaming experiences we’ve seen in recent times, this is one idea that should be encouraged."

References

2014 video games
Dejobaan Games games
Exploration video games
Fictional diaries
Kickstarter-funded video games
Linux games
MacOS games
Side-scrolling video games
Single-player video games
Video games developed in the United States
Windows games
Popcannibal games